is a Japanese business magnate.

Profile
Born May 27, 1940 in Chikuma, Nagano-ken, Tatsumi (nicknamed Tom) finished high school at Nagano HS in 1959 and Business Administration at Meiji University in 1963.

In 1969, he became Sansui Electric's director until 1988, the year he founded TY Limited (then Thomas Yoda Limited).

Still in 1988, Yoda, with Max Matsuura and Ken Suzuki, founded Avex Group, one of Japan's biggest names in music and entertainment.

In 1999, he joined Gaga Communications as a director.

Due to a feud with Matsuura over unknown circumstances, Yoda resigned as Avex's chairman in 2004, but reappointed as honorary chairman until 2005.

As of now, he has his own entertainment company called TY Entertainment.

Other Institutions Served
Aside from Avex and Sansui:
 Osada Electric (1969)
 International Federation of the Phonographic Industry (2000–2004)
 Japan/China Year 2002
 Cabinet Secretariat of Japan (2002–2007)
 Ministry of Economy, Trade and Industry (2003)
 Japan/Korea Friendship Year 2005
 The Foundation for Promotion of Music, Industry and Culture (2001–2006)
 The Japan-China Exchange Year of Culture and Sports 2007
 Rakuten Inc. (2003–2011)

References

 About Tom Yoda

Living people
1940 births
Avex Group people
Japanese businesspeople
Japanese music industry executives
People from Nagano Prefecture
Meiji University alumni